Metaxitagma is a moth genus in the family Autostichidae.

Species
 Metaxitagma connivens Gozmány, 1985
 Metaxitagma mauricum Gozmány, 2008
 Metaxitagma monotona Gozmány, 2008

References

 
Symmocinae
Moth genera